Joshua M. Tybur is a Dutch psychologist who serves as Professor of Psychology and Infectious Disease in the Department of Experimental and Applied Psychology at VU Amsterdam. Much of his research focuses on the evolutionary psychology of disgust.

References

External links
Personal website
Faculty page

Living people
Academic staff of Vrije Universiteit Amsterdam
Arizona State University alumni
University of New Mexico alumni
Dutch psychologists
Evolutionary psychologists
Year of birth missing (living people)